Ismail Changezi (19 December 1954 – 17 July 2019) was a Pakistani television actor. He was known for 1980s drama Jinn Chacha.

Biography 
Ismail was born on 19 December 1954 in Lahore. He later moved to Karachi.

He appeared in more than 100 dramas, including Jangloos, Mandi, God Father, Ankahi, Zero Point and Fifty Fifty. He played the lead role in Jinn Chacha (1980s) and acclaimed fame. He appeared in many as a supporting actor and was known for the playing of negative characters.

Ismail died on 17 July 2019 in Karachi.

References

1954 births
2019 deaths
Pakistani male television actors
20th-century Pakistani male actors
Male actors from Lahore
Male actors from Karachi